is a motorway in the city of Aachen in western Germany.

Exit list 

 
|}

External links 

544
A544